Rasta may refer to:

 Rastafari, a movement and religion or a follower of that movement
 Rasta (Congo), warlords from the Second Congo War
 Rasta (Mandaeism) a white religious garment of the Mandaean sect
 Lester "Rasta" Speight, American football player, wrestler, and actor
 Rasta (singer) (born 1989 as Stefan Đurić), Serbian recording artist and producer
 Stig Rästa (born 1980), Estonian musician

See also
 Raasta (disambiguation)
 Raster (disambiguation)